John Peters may refer to:

Politicians
John A. Peters (1822–1904), U.S. Representative from Maine (1867–1873), Attorney General of Maine (1864–1866) & Maine Supreme Court judge
John A. Peters (1864–1953), U.S. Representative from Maine (1913–1922) and U.S. District Court judge (1922–1947)
John E. Peters (1839–1919), businessman and politician in Newfoundland
John M. Peters (1927–2013), American lawyer and legislator
John Samuel Peters (1772–1858), Governor of Connecticut (1831–1833)

Others
John Peters (catcher) (1893–1932), baseball player from Kansas City
John Peters (chess player) (born 1951), American chess player and newspaper columnist
John Peters (DJ), British radio presenter
John Peters (RAF officer) (born 1961)
John Peters (shortstop) (1850–1924), baseball player from New Orleans
John Durham Peters (born 1958), communications professor
John F. Peters (1884–1969), electrical engineer
John P. Peters (1887–1955), American chemist
John Punnett Peters (1852–1921), American Episcopal clergyman

See also
Jon Peters (born 1945), American movie producer
Jon Peters (pitcher), high school pitcher from Texas
Jonathan Peters (born 1969), American music remixer/DJ